Angela Park was an amusement park located along PA Route 309 in Butler Township, seven miles north of Hazleton, Pennsylvania. The park operated from 1957 through 1988, and its proximity to the Pocono Mountains made it a popular summer attraction in Northeastern Pennsylvania for thirty years. It was owned and operated as part of the Barletta Family enterprises until 1985. Then it was sold to Mirth Master Corp. of Chester County, PA, who operated the park until 1988. After the 1988 season, the ownership filed for bankruptcy. In 1990, the rides and equipment were auctioned off. During the late 1990s, many of the buildings were razed. During the 2000s, the former park served as a training field for Lackawanna College training program for Lackawanna County policemen. Today, the property is owned by New Land Development of Lackawanna County and is undeveloped.

1950s
The idea of an amusement park at this location originated with Angeline Barletta (1896–1952), the matriarch of the Barletta Family who had immigrated to Hazleton, Pennsylvania, from Italy in 1911. Along with her husband Anthony Barletta and their nine children the Barletta Family operated several successful businesses in the Hazleton Region. During the 1940s the family purchased several hundred acres of land along the Nescopeck Creek in the Butler Valley, part of which was developed into a grove for the family to spend weekend getaways. Angeline often spoke of how one day she envisioned part of the land being developed into an amusement park or recreational facility. After she died unexpectedly in 1952 her family was determined to make her dream a reality. Planning and construction took place during 1955 and 1956 and by the spring of 1957 Angela Park, named in honor of Angeline, was ready to open. The original owners were husband Anthony Barletta, sons Frank, Rocco, James, Joseph, Maurice, John and Fred, and their brother-in-law John DePierro. With the exception of their father Anthony who died in 1960, this partnership would remain intact until 1985. Angela Park was one of several businesses owned and operated by the Barletta family during this time. The seven brothers also have partnerships in A. Barletta and Sons, a heavy construction company that manufactured sand, gravel, asphalt and concrete, Barletta Heating Oil and Edgewood In The Pines Golf Course and Restaurant.

Angela Park opened on Mother's Day, May 12, 1957, to a large and enthusiastic crowd. The first year the park had only six rides, four which were designed exclusively for younger children: the Allan Hershel Tank Ride, Boat Ride, Carousel and Airplanes. The other two were the Miniature Train which was a model of the Lehigh Valley Black Diamond and a Roller Coaster. Several cinder block buildings were erected, each exterior painted a different color. The largest of these structures served as the main concession area and had six separate counter areas. The facility included the kitchen, the soft ice cream stand, main ticket window and main office. Directly across from the north end of this structure was the pink-colored sno-cone/cotton candy stand. Opposite the northeast side of the main structure was the green arcade building and directly east of the arcade was a similar-sized blue building which housed the bingo game. Along the north end of the park on the other side of the parking area was maintained a large grove area for picnics and outings. The picnic grove was adjacent to the Nescopeck Creek and was encircled by part of the route of the miniature train tracks. The first manager of the park was Joe Barletta, one of the members of the owner/partnership group.

For the 1958 season two additional rides were added, the Panther Car Ride and the Dodgem Bumper Car Ride. An additional building was added to house a waffle and ice cream stand and a park novelty stand. The size of the park expanded with the addition of an Olympic-size swimming pool, the largest such facility in Northeastern Pennsylvania. The pool area was complete with changing rooms, concession and patio areas, a diving area with three separate boards including a 3-meter board, lounge chairs and benches, a spacious lawn area, two separate wading pools for youngsters and both above-ground and below water lighting for night swimming. Many patrons, especially teenagers, bypassed the other attractions and spent an entire day at the pool. It became the major social gathering spot for Hazleton Region youth from the late 1950s through the mid-1980s. Also added was a stage area at the eastern end of the park and television Star Pinky Lee would become the first of several nationally known acts to perform at Angela Park. One year later a record-setting crowd turned out on July 29, 1959, to see Buffalo Bob Smith and the legendary NBC Television Howdy Doody Show perform.

1960s
The early 1960s saw more additions to the park. Two major activities oriented attractions were added; a miniature golf course and a baseball batting range. Also added to the summer schedule was the popular Saturday Night Swingout, a weekly dance party broadcast live on WAZL Radio. Frontline entertainment attractions continued as WFIL Philadelphia television personalities Sally Starr and Chief Halftown performed in 1960. Popular regional live bands made weekly appearances both on stage and for after dark pool parties. Groups line Mel Wynne and the Rhythm Aces and Ognir and the Night People drew large crowds of teens. Popular Polka Bands like Lefty and the Polka Chaps and Stanky and the Coal Miners drew large adult followings for Sunday performances.

During the mid-1960s several new rides were added including: The Tea Cup Ride (1961), The Paratrooper (1965), The Giant Slide (1966), The Sky Ride (1967) and the Swingin' Gyms (1967). Also during the decade a helicopter ride replaced the airplanes and an antique model car replaced the Panther cars on that ride. During the mid-1960s the miniature train was repainted changing the maroon and black Lehigh Valley Black Diamond to the silver, red and yellow of the Santa Fe War Bonnet. In 1967 Art Holler was hired to replace Joe Barletta as park manager. Holler managed the park for two seasons before resigning. It would be the only two years during the Barletta ownership that a non-partner served as manager. He was replaced by John Barletta who was assisted by his sister Anna DePierro. The two ran the daily operations of the park until the family sold the business following the 1984 season.

In 1969 perhaps the most iconic piece of Angela Park was introduced, Porky The Paper Eater. Designed as a high tech trash receptacle, Porky's "head" stuck out from his "house". His mouth was an opening that vacuumed in paper and other small trash items into a large garbage container within the house. A taped voice message had Porky encouraging kids to not litter. The novel idea worked better than anticipated with youngsters so mesmerized by the talking Porky they often collected stray trash from the ground so they could feed it to Porky. Later a second version of Porky was introduced, Leo The Paper Eating Lion however it never came close to the popularity of Porky.

1970s
In 1970 a golf driving range was constructed at the northeast end of the park. That same year a 1939 Authentic Fire Engine was purchased and the back was fabricated with two vertical rows for seating. With full siren and bell ringing the fire truck would complete a loop around the parks perimeter. For 1971 the Midway kiddie ride was added and the original paratrooper ride was replaced with a more modern version which allowed all cars to be loaded on the ground simultaneously. In 1972 the Satellite Jet ride was added and the original miniature train was replaced by a larger C.P Huntington Civil War Era model. June 1972 saw near disaster as the Nescopeck Creek flooded during Tropical Storm Agnes. The flood waters damaged the picnic grove area, and parts of the golf driving range and turned the parking area into a  lake. However the main park area and most of the rides were spared as the waters edge stopped a few feet away. In the mid-1970s the Swingin' Gyms were dismantled and sold while what would be the last two rides were added; The Tilt A Whirl Ride and the Columbus Ride. In 1976 the golf driving range was converted to a lighted softball field. This new field would host a memorable event in late June of that year when the Bicentennial Wagon Train encamped at Angela Park on their way to Philadelphia. This national celebration of the bicentennial was a re-enactment of a Conestoga Wagon Train expedition complete with overnight camping. It drew thousands of visitors to witness this living history experience.

1980s
The park experienced few changes after the mid-1970s. When Pennsylvania state law was initiated in 1980 permitting bingo games only by non-profit organizations the popular Sunday bingo games ended at Angela Park and the bingo building was converted into a haunted house ride attraction that never gained popularity. The Barletta Family opened the nearby Edgewood-In-The Pines Golf Course in the fall of 1979 and within the next two years they advertised the availability of Angela Park for sale. During the 1984 season a serious offer to purchase the park was made by Joseph Filoromo of Downingtown, Pennsylvania. Along with his mother they formed the Mirth Master Corporation and in 1985 season they bought Angela Park for $1.2 million. During the next four years Mirth Master fell into worsening financial condition and by 1988 the debt on the park was over $1 million. The financial strains reached a breaking point and Mirth Master declared bankruptcy in the spring of 1989 leaving Filoromo no choice but to close the park. The bank seized the property and put the park up for sale at $2 million. Despite local efforts to raise the capital to purchase the operations as well as individual interest no buyer emerged and Angela Park was all but finished. The official end came on an overcast Saturday in May 1990 when the bank auctioned off the park piece by piece. Several of the Angela Park rides are in operation in different locations. The C.P. Huntington train was sold to the zoo in Erie, Pennsylvania. The tank ride is in Knight's Action Park in Springfield, Illinois. The antique car ride is in a New Jersey park and several of the dodgem bumper cars operate at Knoebels Amusement Resort in Elysburg, Pennsylvania.

The park's sole roller coaster was the "Valley Volcano."  Designed by John C. Allen, the coaster was nearly identical to Wyandot Lake's Sea Dragon. During the last few seasons, the park changed the number of cars operating on this coaster, which can be seen in photographs that show the ride with four, three, and two cars on the train.

Documentary
In 2016, Sam-Son Productions, Inc. announced that they would be creating a documentary on the park and finished the process in 2017. The hour long documentary DVD features footage from the park's opening day through its closure. The documentary also features interviews with some of the park owners and their children (who also worked in the park) plus other former employees and park goers. Sam-Son Productions also acquired the full audio recording to one of the park's most famous trash disposal units (Porky the Paper Eater) and it can be heard in its entirety.

References

External links
 DefunctParks.com's Angela Park Page
 North-Eastern PA Lost Parks
 McSweeney's Internet Tendency: I Ran the Scrambler: An Interview with Kim Engler

Defunct amusement parks in Pennsylvania
Amusement parks in Pennsylvania
Buildings and structures in Luzerne County, Pennsylvania
1957 establishments in Pennsylvania
1988 disestablishments in Pennsylvania
Amusement parks opened in 1957
Amusement parks closed in 1989